Amboyna is a genus of moths belonging to the subfamily Tortricinae of the family Tortricidae.

Species
Amboyna diapella Common, 1965
Amboyna furcifera Razowski, 1964

See also
List of Tortricidae genera

References

 , 2005: World Catalogue of Insects vol. 5 Tortricidae.
 , 1964, Discussion of Some Groups of Tortricini (Tortricidae, Lepidoptera) with Descriptions of New Genera and Species. Acta Zoologica Cracoviensia, 9(5): 357–416.

External links

tortricidae.com

Tortricini
Tortricidae genera
Taxa named by Józef Razowski